Keith Alexander Glascoe (December 9, 1962 – September 11, 2001) was an American actor, firefighter, and a member of the NY Jets practice squad. He was killed during September 11 attacks

Death

Glascoe was a firefighter with Ladder 21 of the New York City Fire Department. He was killed in the September 11 attacks.

Filmography

References

External links

1962 births
2001 deaths
African-American male actors
American male film actors
American terrorism victims
Male actors from San Francisco
20th-century American male actors
21st-century American male actors
New York City firefighters
Emergency workers killed in the September 11 attacks
People murdered in New York City
Male murder victims
Terrorism deaths in New York (state)
20th-century African-American politicians
African-American men in politics
20th-century American politicians
21st-century African-American politicians
21st-century American politicians